CFCO (630 AM) is a news, sports, and country music radio station located in Chatham-Kent, Ontario. The station, owned by London, Ontario-based Blackburn Radio, features a heavy local news commitment. CFCO is one of the few dedicated country stations on the AM dial in North America, as well as one of the few to do so in C-QUAM AM Stereo.

History

Classic Gold 630
The AM radio station has been on the air since 1926. CFCO, which stands for "Coming From Chatham Ontario", featured middle of the road and adult contemporary formats through much of its history, moving to an oldies format around 1992, as Classic Gold 630.

The station made several upgrades during this period under the ownership of Bea-Ver Broadcasting, including an increase in nighttime power from 1,000 to 6,000 watts (the station broadcasts with 10,000 watts by day). The high quality of the AM stereo audio of CFCO was for a time even featured on a tuner manufacturer's website.

CFCO-1-FM
In 2000, the station added its FM signal at 92.9 (CFCO-1-FM) to improve reception of the station's programming in office buildings in Chatham. The FM simulcasts the AM 100% and initially broadcast with only 50 watts of power (later quintupled to 250 watts).

Country 92.9 & AM 630
On March 3, 2008 at 9AM, after sixteen years as an oldies station, Classic Gold 630 came to an end with the song "The Beat Goes On" by Sonny and Cher, after which CFCO signed on the new country format with "Play Something Country" by Brooks & Dunn. Opening the station was 32-year CFCO vet George Brooks. This is the first time Chatham-Kent has had its own country music station, although now-sister station CHYR-FM in nearby Leamington was a country station for most of the 1990s and sister station CJSP-FM, also in Leamington, debuted its own country format prior to CFCO's change. Besides CFCO and CJSP, other country stations owned by Blackburn Radio are CHOK in Sarnia-Lambton, CJWF-FM in Windsor, and CKNX in Wingham.

In March 2011, CFCO began referring the station as Country 92-9 FM CFCO with no mention of 630 AM. By 2015, it would include 630 AM once more.

References

External links
 Country 92.9
 
 Radio Locator information for CFCO
 

Fco
Fco
Fco
Radio stations established in 1926
1926 establishments in Ontario